Cohasset is a city in Itasca County, Minnesota, United States. The population was 2,698 at the 2010 census.

U.S. Highway 2 serves as a main route in Cohasset.

History
A post office called Cohasset has been in operation since 1892. The city was named after Cohasset, Massachusetts.

Geography
It is the westernmost point of Minnesota's Iron Range.

Climate

Demographics

2010 census
As of the census of 2010, there were 2,698 people, 1,067 households, and 795 families living in the city. The racial makeup of the city was 94.9% White, 0.1% African American, 2.0% Native American, 0.4% Asian, 0.1% from other races, and 2.5% from two or more races. Hispanic or Latino of any race were 0.6% of the population.

There were 1,067 households, of which 29.2% had children under the age of 18 living with them, 62.5% were married couples living together, 8.2% had a female householder with no husband present, 3.7% had a male householder with no wife present, and 25.5% were non-families. 20.8% of all households were made up of individuals, and 7.8% had someone living alone who was 65 years of age or older. The average household size was 2.52 and the average family size was 2.89.

The median age in the city was 46 years. 23.2% of residents were under the age of 18; 5.8% were between the ages of 18 and 24; 19.6% were from 25 to 44; 35.2% were from 45 to 64; and 16.3% were 65 years of age or older. The gender makeup of the city was 50.3% male and 49.7% female.

2000 census
As of the census of 2000, there were 2,481 people, 960 households, and 740 families living in the city. The racial makeup of the city was 96.65% White, 0.20% African American, 0.93% Native American, 0.16% Asian, 0.16% from other races, and 1.89% from two or more races. Hispanic or Latino of any race were 0.32% of the population.

There were 960 households, out of which 33.6% had children under the age of 18 living with them, 66.6% were married couples living together, 7.5% had a female householder with no husband present, and 22.9% were non-families. 19.1% of all households were made up of individuals, and 7.5% had someone living alone who was 65 years of age or older.  The average household size was 2.58 and the average family size was 2.93.

In the city, the population was spread out, with 25.9% under the age of 18, 6.5% from 18 to 24, 24.1% from 25 to 44, 31.1% from 45 to 64, and 12.3% who were 65 years of age or older.  The median age was 41 years. For every 100 females, there were 101.2 males.  For every 100 females age 18 and over, there were 101.2 males.

The median income for a household in the city was $44,054, and the median income for a family was $48,849. Males had a median income of $48,869 versus $25,250 for females. The per capita income for the city was $21,071.  About 4.9% of families and 5.6% of the population were below the poverty line, including 4.5% of those under age 18 and 8.1% of those age 65 or over.

References

External links
 City of Cohasset, MN – Official site

Cities in Minnesota
Cities in Itasca County, Minnesota
Minnesota populated places on the Mississippi River